Grace Park may refer to:

People
 Grace Park (actress) (born 1974), American-born Canadian actress of Korean descent
 Grace Park (golfer) (born 1979), South Korean professional golfer
Fictional characters
 Grace Park, a fictional NBC page portrayed by Charlyne Yi in the 30 Rock episode, "The C Word"